Cristopher Javier Fiermarin Forlán (born 1 January 1998) is a Uruguayan professional footballer who plays as a goalkeeper for Montevideo City Torque.

Club career
A youth academy graduate of Defensor Sporting, Fiermarin joined newly promoted side Montevideo City Torque on loan for 2018 season. He made his professional debut on 1 April 2018, by replacing Jonathan Cubero in a 2–0 league win against Peñarol.

On 22 July 2021, Belgian club Lommel announced the signing of Fiermarin on a season long loan deal.

International career
Fiermarin is a former Uruguayan youth national team player. He was part of Uruguay at 2015 South American U-17 Championship. However he didn't play any match in the tournament as he was third-choice goalkeeper behind Renzo Rodríguez and Francisco Tinaglini.

On 29 December 2019, he was named in 23-man final squad for 2020 CONMEBOL Pre-Olympic Tournament.

Personal life
Fiermarin is a distant relative of Diego Forlán.

Career statistics

Honours
Montevideo City Torque
Uruguayan Segunda División: 2019

References

External links
 

1998 births
Living people
People from Rosario, Uruguay
Association football goalkeepers
Uruguayan footballers
Uruguay youth international footballers
Uruguayan Primera División players
Montevideo City Torque players
Lommel S.K. players
Uruguayan expatriate footballers
Expatriate footballers in Belgium